Norrö is an island in the northern part of Stockholm archipelago, which forms part of Värmdö Municipality, Stockholm County, Sweden.

External links 
 

Islands of Värmdö Municipality
Islands of the Stockholm archipelago